Megachile kirbyana is a species of bee in the family Megachilidae. It was described by Theodore Dru Alison Cockerell in 1906, from a specimen collected in Fremantle.

In Australia, it is found only in Western Australia.

References

Kirbyana
Insects described in 1906